Izzatullah Bengali was an 18th-century Bengali author who wrote in the Persian language.

Biography
Izzatullah Bengali was from Murshidabad, the erstwhile capital of the Bengal Subah. At the time, the Persian language was the official language in Bengal and other parts of South Asia. After coming across Taj al-Mulk Gul-e-Bakawali, a popular Hindustani story, and narrating it to his friend Nazar Muhammad, Izzatullah wrote the story in Persian for his friend in 1722.

A manuscript of his work is located at the University of Dhaka library. In 1803, his work was translated into Urdu by Munshi Nihal Chand Lahori of Fort William College with the title Mazhab-e-Ishq (Religion of Love).

References

18th-century Bengalis
18th-century Indian Muslims
17th-century births
18th-century births
18th-century Persian-language writers
18th-century male writers